"Children's Zoo" is the second segment of the third episode of the first season (1985–86) of the television series The Twilight Zone. This is one of the few stories without narration.

Plot
Debbie is a four-year-old girl starved for attention because her parents are always fighting. Her mother yells at her and her father is too lazy to give her any quality time. Debbie asks her parents to take her to the Children's Zoo. A friend gave her an invitation which specifies that both parents must accompany the child.

At the zoo, Debbie is directed to the children's entrance after the keeper confirms that her friend explained to her the nature of the Children's Zoo. Her parents are ostensibly taken to a waiting room. Inside, it is revealed that parents who bring their children to the Children's Zoo are in fact locked in display rooms which the children peruse, selecting their new parents from among them. The newer parental arrivals vainly threaten the zoo staff and demand to be let out, while others seem to have gone half-insane from prolonged captivity, and plead with and try to bribe Debbie to choose them. Debbie chooses a more subdued couple who tell her that they have learned their lesson and will try to be the best parents they can.

Debbie's parents watch with a mixture of anger, confusion, and horror as their daughter walks off with her chosen parents to a better life.

Production
Wes Craven appears in a cameo, as the angry, threatening father. He directed several episodes of this series.

References
 

1985 American television episodes
The Twilight Zone (1985 TV series season 1) episodes

fr:Zoo d'enfants